Studio AKA is a British animation studio producing television commercials, TV programmes and short films. The company was founded in 1989 (as Pizzaz Pictures). Notable productions include Hey Duggee, a TV series aimed at 2 to 5 year olds produced for CBeebies, which was recommissioned for a second and third series and which was awarded an International Emmy in 2017 and a BAFTA, and Lost and Found, an animated short film based on the children’s picture book by Oliver Jeffers, which won a BAFTA in 2009.

References

Television production companies of the United Kingdom
British animation studios
1989 establishments in England